This is a list of members of the 40th Legislative Assembly of Queensland from 1972 to 1974, as elected at the 1972 state election held on 27 May 1972.

 The Country Party changed its name to the National Party on 6 April 1974.

See also
1972 Queensland state election
Premier: Joh Bjelke-Petersen (National Party) (1968–1987)

References

 

Members of Queensland parliaments by term
20th-century Australian politicians